The Rotuma myzomela (Myzomela chermesina) is a species of bird in the family Meliphagidae.
It is endemic to the island of Rotuma in the far north of Fiji.

Its natural habitats are tropical moist lowland forests, secondary forest and coconut plantations. The species is tolerant of habitat loss but is listed as vulnerable due to its tiny range.

References

External links
BirdLife Species Factsheet.

Rotuma myzomela
Endemic birds of Fiji
Rotuma myzomela
Taxonomy articles created by Polbot